(179806)  (also written 2002 TD66) is a sub-kilometer asteroid, classified as near-Earth object of the Apollo group. It was discovered on 5 October 2002, by the LINEAR project at Lincoln Laboratory's ETS in Socorro, New Mexico. It was announced on 7 October 2002 and appeared later that day on the JPL current risk page.

Description 

Due to the proximity of its orbit to Earth and its estimated size, this object has been classified as a potentially hazardous asteroid (PHA) by the Minor Planet Center in Cambridge, Massachusetts. In November 2006 there were 823 PHAs known. , there are 1261 PHAs known.  was removed from the Sentry Risk Table on October 10, 2002. A Doppler observation has helped produce a well known trajectory with a condition code (Uncertainty Parameter U) of 0.

Based on an absolute magnitude (H) of 20.2, the asteroid is estimated to be between 270 and 590 meters in diameter. Radar astronomy shows it is a contact binary asteroid with a diameter of 300 meters and a rotation period of 9.5 hours.

On February 26, 2008,  passed  from Earth. The asteroid also comes close to Venus, Mars, and dwarf planet Ceres.

References

External links 
 Orbital path diagram of  (0.04 AU from Earth on 25 February 2008)
 Lightcurve plot of (179806) 2002 TD66, Palmer Divide Observatory, B. D. Warner (2008)
 Asteroid Lightcurve Database (LCDB), query form (info )
 Sormano Astronomical Observatory: Minor Body Priority List
 Minimum Orbital Intersection Distance
 Closest Approaches to the Earth by Minor Planets
 
 
 

179806
179806
179806
179806
179806
20021005